The Olympus Guard Station near Port Angeles, Washington was built in 1930s. It was built by the U.S. Forest Service and was designed by architects of the U.S. Forest Service.  It is located about nine miles backcountry, within what is now the National Park Service-administered Olympic National Park.

It was listed on the National Register of Historic Places in 2007. It has also been known as OGS and as Olympus Guard Station Historic District.

References

National Register of Historic Places in Jefferson County, Washington
Buildings and structures completed in 1935
Buildings and structures in Jefferson County, Washington
Historic districts on the National Register of Historic Places in Washington (state)
National Register of Historic Places in Olympic National Park
National Park Service rustic in Washington (state)